Lawrence Jay Duplass (born March 7, 1973) is an American filmmaker, actor and author widely known for his films The Puffy Chair (2005), Cyrus (2010), and Jeff, Who Lives at Home (2011), made in collaboration with his younger brother, Mark Duplass.

Duplass starred in the Amazon Video comedy-drama series Transparent (2014–2019), and co-created the HBO comedy-drama series Togetherness (2015–16) and the HBO anthology series Room 104 (2017–2020).

Early life
Duplass was born in New Orleans, Louisiana, the son of Cynthia (née Ernst) and Lawrence  Duplass. He was raised in a Catholic family, and attended Jesuit High School. Duplass graduated from the University of Texas at Austin with an MFA in film. His ancestry includes French Cajun, Italian, Ashkenazi Jewish, and German.

Career

Directing 
Duplass attributes much of his and his brother's love for film to his appreciation for Raising Arizona. In an interview with Robert K. Elder for The Film That Changed My Life, Duplass speculates on what might have happened had he not seen the film in his youth.I probably wouldn't be making movies—seriously. It held over for so long. It really was the root of everything that Mark and I always hold ourselves to in making movies. That is to say that Raising Arizona is the most inspired movie that I have ever seen.In 2015, Mark and Jay Duplass via their Duplass Brothers Television label signed an overall deal with HBO.

Acting 
In 2014, he starred as Josh Pfefferman in the Amazon Prime Original Comedy-Drama Series Transparent, alongside Jeffrey Tambor, Gaby Hoffmann, Amy Landecker and Judith Light. The series was met with widespread critical acclaim, earning 11 Primetime Emmy nominations, including nominations for Best Comedy Series and Best Actor in a Comedy Series for Jeffrey Tambor. In the second season of the show, Duplass's role became more prominent, and he was nominated for the Critics' Choice Television Award for Best Supporting Actor in a Comedy Series.

Prior to Transparent, Duplass had never acted in a featured part. He was talking with director Joey Soloway at a dinner party about the difficulty they were having finding an actor to play what would end up being Duplass's role. After suggesting many actors for the part to Soloway, Soloway turned to Duplass and told him that he should play the part.

Favorite films 
In 2012, Duplass participated in the Sight & Sound film polls of that year. Held every ten years to select the greatest films of all time, contemporary directors were asked to select ten films of their choice.

 American Movie (USA, 1999)
 The Big Lebowski (USA, 1998)
 Close-Up (Iran, 1990)
 The Horse Boy (USA, 2009)
 Raising Arizona (USA, 1987)
 Rocky (USA, 1976)
 The Thin Blue Line (USA, 1989)
 Tootsie (USA, 1982)
 Who's Afraid of Virginia Woolf? (USA, 1966)
 A Woman Under the Influence (USA, 1974)

Filmography

Film

Executive producer only

 Black Rock (2012)
 Safety Not Guaranteed (2012)
 Bad Milo! (2013)
 The Skeleton Twins (2014)
 The One I Love (2014)
 Adult Beginners (2014)
 Tangerine (2015)
 Manson Family Vacation (2015)
 The Bronze (2015)
 6 Years (2015)
 Rainbow Time (2016)
 Take Me (2017)
 Duck Butter (2018)
 The MisEducation of Bindu (2019)
 Horse Girl (2020)
 As of Yet (2021)
 Language Lessons (2021)
 Not Going Quietly (2021)
 7 Days (2021)

Television

Short film

Acting roles

Film

Television

Bibliography 

 Like Brothers (2018) (with Mark Duplass)

References

External links
 
 Interview with Jay and Mark Duplass on "Baghead" at IFC.com

1973 births
21st-century American male actors
American film directors
American male screenwriters
American male television actors
American male voice actors
Cajun people
Film producers from Louisiana
Living people
Male actors from New Orleans
Screenwriters from Louisiana
University of Texas at Austin alumni
Writers from New Orleans